Charlie F. Waller (November 26, 1921 – September 5, 2009) was an American Professional Football head coach for the San Diego Chargers from 1969, the last season of the American Football League, to 1970, the first season of the merged National Football League. His total coaching record at the end of his career was 9 wins, 7 losses and 3 ties. Waller was offensive backfield coach and took over for Chargers head coach Sid Gillman on November 14, 1969 after Gillman's resignation due to poor health, Gilman remained as general manager.
After Gillman's health improved he was named Charger head coach on December 30, 1970 and Waller offensive coach. He is a 1942 graduate of Oglethorpe University and a 1980 inductee in its Athletic Hall of Fame. He was head football coach at Decatur, Georgia High School in the 1940s. In 1951, he joined Ralph Jordan's staff as offensive backfield coach at Auburn University.

Waller was later an assistant coach for George Allen and the Washington Redskins.

References

1921 births
2009 deaths
Auburn Tigers football coaches
Clemson Tigers football coaches
High school football coaches in Georgia (U.S. state)
Oglethorpe Stormy Petrels baseball players
Oglethorpe Stormy Petrels football players
People from Decatur, Georgia
San Diego Chargers coaches
Sports coaches from Georgia (U.S. state)
Sportspeople from DeKalb County, Georgia
Texas Longhorns football coaches
Washington Redskins coaches
University of Georgia alumni
San Diego Chargers head coaches